Dietmar Schmidt (born 29 April 1952 in Zwickau) is a former East German handball player who competed in the 1980 Summer Olympics.

He was a member of the East German handball team which won the gold medal. He played all six matches and scored two goals.

External links
profile

1952 births
Living people
People from Zwickau
German male handball players
Sportspeople from Saxony
Olympic handball players of East Germany
Handball players at the 1980 Summer Olympics
Olympic gold medalists for East Germany
Olympic medalists in handball
Medalists at the 1980 Summer Olympics
Recipients of the Patriotic Order of Merit in gold